Shakil Ahmed (born 7 January 1988) is a retired Bangladeshi footballer who last played as a midfielder for Sheikh Russel KC and the Bangladesh national team. He made his international debut in 2011. His brother Zahid Hasan Ameli is also a Bangladesh national team player

International goals
Scores and results list Bangladesh's goal tally first.

References

Living people
1988 births
Bangladeshi footballers
Bangladesh international footballers
Bangladesh Football Premier League players
Sheikh Russel KC players
Mohammedan SC (Dhaka) players
Sheikh Jamal Dhanmondi Club players
Muktijoddha Sangsad KC players
Brothers Union players
Footballers at the 2010 Asian Games
Association football midfielders
Asian Games competitors for Bangladesh